NGC 7837 is a spiral galaxy located about 470 million light-years away in the constellation of Pisces. The galaxy was discovered by astronomer Albert Marth on November 29, 1864. NGC 7837 appears to interact with NGC 7838 forming Arp 246.

See also 
 List of NGC objects (7001–7840)

References

External links 

7837
246
516
Pisces (constellation)
Astronomical objects discovered in 1864
Spiral galaxies
Discoveries by Albert Marth